Wedding Bell Blues is a 1996 romantic comedy film directed by Dana Lustig and starring  Illeana Douglas, supermodel Paulina Porizkova, and Julie Warner. The film was named after the classic 1960s Laura Nyro/5th Dimension song "Wedding Bell Blues".

Cast
 Illeana Douglas as Jasmine
 Paulina Porizkova as Tanya Touchev
 Julie Warner as Micki Rachel Levine
 John Corbett as Cary Maynard Philco
 Jonathan Penner as Matt Smith
 Charles Martin Smith as Oliver Napier
 Steven Gilborn as Samuel Levine
 Richard Edson as Tom
 Stephanie Beacham as Tanya's mother
 Carla Gugino as Violet
 Debbie Reynolds as herself

Release
The film, with an R Rating, grossed only $44,052 in the domestic box office, on a maximum/initial release of 11 theaters.

References

External links
 
 
 
 

1996 films
1996 romantic comedy films
American romantic comedy films
1990s English-language films
1990s female buddy films
Films set in the Las Vegas Valley
Films shot in the Las Vegas Valley
American independent films
Films produced by Ram Bergman
1996 independent films
Films directed by Dana Lustig
1990s American films
American female buddy films